Eve Gordon (also known as Eve Bennett-Gordon) is an American actress. Her television roles include playing Marilyn Monroe in the Emmy Award-winning miniseries A Woman Named Jackie, Congressional aide Jordan Miller in the short-lived sitcom The Powers That Be, the mother of the title character in the drama series Felicity, and Monica Klain, the wife of Ron Klain (played by Kevin Spacey) in the 2008 Emmy Award-winning HBO film Recount. She also starred in the 1997 film Honey, We Shrunk Ourselves, starring opposite Rick Moranis.

Life and career
Gordon is the daughter of Mary (née McDougall), a history professor, and Richard Bennett Gordon, a lawyer. Gordon graduated from the Ellis School in Pittsburgh, Brown University, and Yale School of Drama.

She started her acting career in 1982, playing Marge Tallworth in the film The World According to Garp. After that, she appeared in ER, Come On Get Happy: The Partridge Family Story, Avalon and Honey, We Shrunk Ourselves (as Diane Szalinski, taking the role over from Marcia Strassman), and starred in David Chase's first original series, Almost Grown, and The Good Life with Drew Carey.

On the stage, she has starred on and off-Broadway, in Paris, Madrid, Chicago, Los Angeles, and many other cities, working with Peter Sellers, Richard Foreman, and Daniel Sullivan in classics, musicals, and comedies.

On November 14, 1987, Gordon married actor Todd Waring in Manhattan. They have two daughters.

Filmography

Podcast

References

External links
 

20th-century American actresses
21st-century American actresses
Actresses from Pittsburgh
American film actresses
American television actresses
Brown University alumni
Living people
Yale School of Drama alumni
Year of birth missing (living people)